Anubias barteri is a West African species of Anubias, first described in 1860 by Heinrich Wilhelm Schott. It occurs in south-eastern Nigeria, Cameroon and on Bioko.

Description 
The rhizome remains above the substrate, tethered to litter like rocks and wood.

Cultivation 
This plant grows well partially and fully submersed. In strong light, the leaves grow more quickly and remain more compact, but it tolerates a range of lighting. It can be propagated by dividing the rhizome or by separating side shoots. If buried beneath a substrate, the rhizome may rot.

Varieties 
The species has the following varieties:
Anubias barteri var. angustifolia
Anubias barteri var. caladiifolia
Anubias barteri var. glabra
Anubias barteri var. nana

References 

barteri
Aquatic plants
Flora of West Tropical Africa
Flora of West-Central Tropical Africa
Plants described in 1860